Statistics of Japanese Regional Leagues for the 1967 season.

Champions list

League standings

Kanto

Tokai

Kansai

1967
Japanese Regional Leagues
2